Lizu (Western Ersu) is a Qiangic language spoken in Western Sichuan, China. There are 4,000 speakers according to Sun (1982) and 7,000 speakers according to Chirkova (2008). Muli, where Lizu is spoken, is a multi-ethnic and multi-lingual county and Lizu has been historically influenced by Mandarin Chinese.

Varieties
Yu (2009: 2) lists the following varieties of Lizu:
Mianning Lizu: spoken in Lagusa 拉姑萨 Village (Lizu name `wontʂʰɨ `lombɑ), He’ai (“Hoŋai”) 和爱 Township, Mianning 冕宁 County, Liangshan 凉山 Prefecture. Documented by Yu (2012).
Kala Lizu: spoken in Kala 卡拉 Township, Muli 木里 County, Liangshan Prefecture. Documented by Chirkova (2008); Huáng and Rénzēng (1991); and Dài and Huáng (1992).
Naiqu Lizu: spoken in Naiqu 乃渠 Village, Naiqu Township, Jiulong 九龙 County, Garzê (Gānzī 甘孜) Prefecture. Documented by Ikeda (2009).

References

External links 
 ELAR archive of Lizu language documentation materials

Qiangic languages
Languages of China